Tsolak Yeghishyan (born 8 December 1970) is an Armenian Greco-Roman wrestler. He became an Espoir European Champion in 1990. Yeghishyan competed at the 1996 Summer Olympics in the men's 90 kg division, coming in 9th place.

References

External links
 

1970 births
Living people
Sportspeople from Gyumri
Armenian male sport wrestlers
Olympic wrestlers of Armenia
Wrestlers at the 1996 Summer Olympics
20th-century Armenian people